Nij (also known as Nidzh; ; Udi: НыъжӀ or НиъжӀ) is a town in the Qabala District of Azerbaijan, located forty kilometers south-west of Qabala. It's one of the world's few settlements of Udi people. It has a population of 5,744.

History 

The Caucasian Albanian-Udi Apostolic Autocephalous Church is located in Nij.

The first Udi school and subsequently a Russian rural school were opened in Nij in 1854. From 1931 to 1933, Udis received education in their own language; in 1937 they began to receive education in the Azerbaijani language.

Ethnic Udis in Nij today are involved in a variety of vocations, which include farming, cattle breeding, rice cultivation, sericulture, horticulture, poultry farming, craftsmanship and viticulture.

Alexandre Dumas père, the French writer, in his book Voyage to the Caucasus (1859), provides detailed information about the specific economic activities, language and culture of Nij.

Controversy
In 2004, Church of Saint Elisæus in Nij was renovated as part of a project financed by Norwegian Humanitarian Enterprise. The destruction of Armenian inscriptions associated with the church during the renovations prompted a protest by Norway's ambassador to Azerbaijan, Steinar Gil.

In May 2018, Foreign Minister of Armenia submitted a report to the UN General Assembly claiming that the erasing of the Armenian inscriptions at Nij was evidence that "all restoration work of Christian architectural monuments in Azerbaijan was carried out in such a way as to destroy the traces of Armenian architecture, as well as the Armenian inscriptions".

Gallery

References 

Populated places in Qabala District
Elizavetpol Governorate